Dingman is a surname. Notable people with the surname include:

Chris Dingman (born 1976), Canadian ice hockey player
Craig Dingman (born 1974), American baseball player
Dean Dingman (born 1968), American football offensive guard
Helen Dingman (1885–1978), American academic and social worker
Ian Dingman (born 1982), American lacrosse player
Mary Dingman (1875–1961), American social and peace activist
Maurice John Dingman (1914–1992), American Roman Catholic bishop
Michael D. Dingman (1931–2017), American investor, businessman, and philanthropist

See also
Dingman Township, Pike County, Pennsylvania